Gerloc (or Geirlaug), baptised in Rouen as Adela (or Adèle) in 912, was the daughter of Rollo, of Normandy, Count of Rouen, and his wife, Poppa of Bayeux. She was the sister of William I Longsword of Normandy.

In 935, she married William Towhead, the future Count of Poitou and Duke of Aquitaine. They had two children together before she died on 14 October 962:

William IV of Aquitaine
Adelaide of Aquitaine, wife of Hugh Capet.

References

912 births
962 deaths
French duchesses
Duchesses of Aquitaine
People from Rouen
House of Normandy
10th-century French women
10th-century Normans
10th-century Norman women